The 2017–18 season is Liverpool Ladies Football Club's 29th season of competitive football and its eighth season in the FA Women's Super League and at the top level of English women's football, being one of the league's foundation clubs.

Following a reorganisation of top-level women's football in England, the 2017–18 season was the first after the FA WSL shifted its calendar to match the traditional autumn-to-spring axis of football in Europe.

First team

Last updated on 19 February 2018

New contracts

Transfers and loans

Transfers in

Transfers out

Loans in

Loans out

Pre-season

Toulouse International Ladies Cup

Competitions

Women's Super League

Results summary

Results by matchday

Matches

FA Cup

FA WSL Cup

Group stage

Knock-out rounds

Appearances and goals

Players without any appearance are not included.

|-
|colspan="14"|Goalkeepers:
|-

|-
|colspan="14"|Defenders:
|-

|-
|colspan="14"|Midfielders:
|-

|-
|colspan="14"|Forwards:
|-

|-
|colspan="14"|Players who left the club during the season:
|-

|-

Honours

 FA WSL 1 Player of the Month: Bethany England, January 2018.

References

Liverpool L.F.C. seasons